Bouteloua aristidoides, the needle grama, is an annual desert grass (Poaceae) found in California, Arizona, and western North America.

References

aristidoides